Jorge Aguirre de Céspedes (born 13 July 2001) is a Spanish professional footballer who plays as a forward for Real Sociedad B.

Club career
Born in Lesaka, Navarre, Aguirre joined Real Sociedad's youth setup in 2016, from Beti Gazte KJKE. He made his senior debut with the C-team on 25 August 2018, starting in a 2–0 Tercera División away win over SD San Pedro.

Aguirre scored his first senior goal on 2 September 2018, netting the C's fifth in a 6–0 home routing of Zamudio SD. He first appeared with the reserves on 1 November 2020; after coming on as a late substitute for Daniel Garrido, he scored the side's third in a 3–0 home win over CD Laredo, after just 46 seconds on the field.

Aguirre made his professional debut with the B-side on 31 December 2021, replacing Luca Sangalli late into a 2–3 loss at SD Eibar in the Segunda División championship. The following 20 January, he moved on loan to fellow second division side CD Mirandés for the remainder of the season.

References

External links

2000 births
Living people
Spanish footballers
Footballers from Navarre
Association football forwards
Segunda División players
Segunda Federación players
Tercera División players
Real Sociedad C footballers
Real Sociedad B footballers
CD Mirandés footballers